The People's Bank of China (officially PBC or informally PBOC) is the central bank of the People's Republic of China, responsible for carrying out monetary policy and regulation of financial institutions in mainland China, as determined by the People's Bank Law and the Commercial Bank Law. It is a cabinet-level executive department of the State Council.

History 
The bank was established on December 1, 1948, based on the consolidation of the Huabei Bank, the Beihai Bank and the Xibei Farmer Bank. The headquarters was first located in Shijiazhuang, Hebei, and then moved to Beijing in 1949. Between 1950 and 1978 the PBC was the only bank in the People's Republic of China and was responsible for both central banking and commercial banking operations.  All other banks within Mainland China such as the Bank of China were either organized as divisions of the PBC or were non-deposit taking agencies.

From 1952 to 1955 government shares were added to private banks to make state-private banks, until under the first Five Year plan from 1955 to 1959 the PBC had complete control of the private banks, making them branches of the PBC, closely resembling the vision of Vladimir Lenin. With aid from the Soviet Union, the shares of private enterprises and with them industrial output followed a similar path, forming a Soviet-style planned economy.

With the exception of special allocations for rural development, the monolithic PBC dominated all business transactions and credit until 1978, when, as part of the Chinese economic reforms, the State Council split off the commercial banking functions of the PB into four independent but state-owned banks, including the Industrial and Commercial Bank of China (ICBC), the Bank of China (BOC), the Agricultural Bank of China (ABC), and the China Construction Bank (CCB). In 1983, the State Council promulgated that the PBC would function as the central bank of China.

Chen Yuan was instrumental in modernizing the bank in the early 1990s. Its central bank status was legally confirmed on March 18, 1995 by the 3rd Plenum of the 8th National People's Congress, and was granted a higher degree of independence than other State Council ministries by an act that year. In 1998, the PBC underwent a major restructuring. All provincial and local branches were abolished, and the PBC opened nine regional branches, whose boundaries did not correspond to local administrative boundaries. In 2003, the Standing Committee of the Tenth National People's Congress approved an amendment law for strengthening the role of PBC in the making and implementation of monetary policy for safeguarding the overall financial stability and provision of financial services.

While operating with some degree of autonomy, the PBC does not have central bank independence and is politically required to implement the policies of the Chinese Communist Party.

Management 
The top management of the PBC are composed of the governor and a certain number of deputy governors. The governor of the PBC is appointed or removed by the National People's Congress or its Standing Committee. The candidate for the governor of the PBC is nominated by the Premier of the People's Republic of China and approved by the National People's Congress. When the National People's Congress is in adjournment, the Standing Committee sanctions the candidacy for the governor of the PBC. The deputy governors of the PBC are appointed to or removed from office by the Premier of the State Council.

The PBC adopts the governor responsibility system under which the governor supervises the overall work of the PBC while the deputy governors provide assistance to the governor to fulfill his or her responsibility.

The current governor is Yi Gang. Deputy governors of the management team include: Wang Huaqing, Pan Gongsheng, Fan Yifei, Guo Qingping, Zhang Xiaohui, and Yang Ziqiang. Former top-level managers include: Ms. Hu Xiaolian, Liu Shiyu, Li Dongrong and Ms. Jin Qi.

Structure 

The PBC has established 9 regional branches, one each in Tianjin, Shenyang, Shanghai, Nanjing, Jinan, Wuhan, Guangzhou, Chengdu and Xi'an, 2 operations offices in Beijing and Chongqing, 303 municipal sub-branches and 1809 county-level sub-branches.

It has 6 overseas representative offices (PBC Representative Office for America, PBC Representative Office (London) for Europe, PBC Tokyo Representative Office, PBC Frankfurt Representative Office, PBC Representative Office for Africa, Liaison Office of the PBC in the Caribbean Development Bank).

The PBC consists of 18 functional departments (bureaus) as below:

General Administration Department
Legal Affairs Department
Monetary Policy Department
Financial Market Department
Financial Stability Bureau
Financial Survey and Statistics Department
Accounting and Treasury Department
Payment System Department
Technology Department
Currency, Gold and Silver Bureau
State Treasury Bureau
International Department
Internal Auditing Department
Personnel Department
Research Bureau
Credit Information System Bureau
Anti-Money Laundering Bureau (Security Bureau)
Education Department of the CPC PBC Committee

The following enterprises and institutions are directly under the PBC:

China Anti-Money Laundering Monitoring and Analysis Center
PBC Graduate School
China Financial Publishing House
Financial News
China National Clearing Center
China Banknote Printing and Minting Corporation
China Gold Coin Incorporation
China Financial Computerization Corporation
China Foreign Exchange Trade System

Microfinance 
Rural credit cooperatives

Financial inclusion 
The PBC is active in promoting financial inclusion policy and a member of the Alliance for Financial Inclusion.

List of governors

Interest rates 

Previously, interest rates set by the bank were always divisible by nine, instead of by 25 as in the rest of the world.
However, since the central bank began to increase rates by 0.25 percentage points on October 19, 2010, this is no longer the case.

PBC latest interest rate changes:

Reserve requirement ratio 

PBC latest reserve requirement ratio (RRR) changes:

Foreign-exchange reserves
Foreign-exchange reserves from 2004:

See also 

 China Banknote Printing and Minting Corporation
 Renminbi, the Chinese national currency
 Internationalization of the renminbi
 Bank of China, state-owned commercial bank
 Hong Kong Monetary Authority
 Monetary Authority of Macao
 Central Bank of Taiwan
 List of largest banks
 List of microfinance banks

References

Further reading 
 Stephen Bell and Hui Feng. The Rise of the People's Bank of China: The Politics of Institutional Change (Harvard University Press; 2013) 384 pages;  Recent history; uses interviews with key figures

External links 

 People's Bank of China official website

 
China, People's Republic of
Banks of China
Monetary reform
Banks established in 1948
Chinese companies established in 1948
1948 establishments in China